L.A. Is My Lady is the 57th and final solo studio album by Frank Sinatra, released in 1984 and produced by Quincy Jones. While the album was Sinatra's last (excluding the Duets albums), he recorded five further songs, only four of which have been officially released.

The album came after an album of duets between Sinatra and Lena Horne, instigated by Jones, was abandoned after Horne developed vocal problems and Sinatra, committed to other engagements, couldn't wait to record. This was the first studio album Sinatra had recorded with Jones since 1964's It Might as Well Be Swing.

The sessions were filmed, with a small audience, and released as Frank Sinatra: Portrait of an Album (1985). The documentary shows Sinatra meeting Michael Jackson for the first time, with Jones affectionately calling Jackson "Smelly".

Singers Dean Martin, Donna Summer, Michael McDonald and Van Halen members David Lee Roth & Eddie Van Halen make cameo appearances in the video for "L.A. Is My Lady", which in turn made moderate rotation on the fledgling MTV Network.

Despite its title, the album was mostly recorded in New York City. The album peaked at #58 on the Billboard 200, and #8 on the Top Jazz Albums chart.

One notable departure for Sinatra was the clear inclusion of synthesizers on the title track.

Songs 

 This was the first time Sinatra recorded "Mack the Knife". He re-recorded the vocal on October 30, 1986 (combined with the original orchestra track) for the album's 1986 release on compact disc. The musicians that Sinatra name-checks on "Mack the Knife" are; Quincy Jones, Randy Brecker, Michael Brecker, George Benson, Joe Newman, Frank Foster, and Lionel Hampton. The double bassist Major Holley scats over the opening bars of the song.
 Sammy Cahn wrote a new verse for "Teach Me Tonight", referencing Sinatra's many love affairs.
 Cahn also altered the lyrics of "Until the Real Thing Comes Along", with Sinatra claiming "I'd even punch out Mr. T for you".
 In the liner notes, Jones says he had a new arrangement of "Body and Soul" planned for the album, but Sinatra had nothing new to say with the song, and declined to record it. Nevertheless, Sinatra did record a vocal track for the song during the sessions, and Sinatra's vocal for "Body and Soul" from the L.A. Is My Lady sessions was added to a new arrangement by Torrie Zito and released as a bonus track on Nothing But the Best, a 2008 compilation album.

Track listing 
 "L.A. Is My Lady" (Alan and Marilyn Bergman, Quincy Jones, Peggy Lipton Jones) – 3:12
 "The Best of Everything" (Fred Ebb, John Kander) – 2:45
 "How Do You Keep the Music Playing?" (A. Bergman, M. Bergman, Michel Legrand) – 3:49
 "Teach Me Tonight" (Sammy Cahn, Gene de Paul) – 3:44
 "It's All Right With Me" (Cole Porter) – 2:39
 "Mack the Knife" (Marc Blitzstein, Bertolt Brecht, Kurt Weill) – 4:50
 "Until the Real Thing Comes Along" (Mann Holiner, Alberta Nichols, Cahn, Saul Chaplin, L.E. Freeman) – 3:03
 "Stormy Weather" (Harold Arlen, Ted Koehler) – 3:38
 "If I Should Lose You" (Ralph Rainger, Leo Robin) – 2:36
 "A Hundred Years from Today" (Joe Young, Ned Washington, Victor Young) – 3:04
 "After You've Gone" (Henry Creamer, Turner Layton) – 3:15

 Quincy Jones arranged track 1.
 Torrie Zito arranged tracks 1 & 4.
 Dave Matthews & Jerry Hey arranged track 1.
 Joe Parnello arranged tracks 2 & 3.
 Frank Foster arranged tracks 6 & 11.
 Sammy Nestico arranged tracks 5, 7, 8, 9 & 10.

Charts

Personnel 
 Frank Sinatra – vocals
 Harry Lookofsky – Concert Master
 Oscar Brashear – trumpet
 Randy Brecker – trumpet, flugelhorn
 Jon Faddis – trumpet
 Gary Grant – trumpet
 Joe Newman – trumpet
 Alan Rubin – trumpet, flugelhorn, piccolo trumpet
 Lew Soloff – trumpet
 Snooky Young – trumpet
 Jerry Hey – trumpet, arranger
 Wayne Andre – trombone
 George Bohanon – trombone
 Urbie Green – trombone
 Lew McCreary – trombone
 Benny Powell – trombone
 Bill Reichenbach Jr. – trombone
 David Taylor – bass trombone
 Bill Watrous – trombone
 Michael Brecker – saxophone
 Buddy Collette – reeds
 Ronnie Cuber – baritone saxophone
 William Green – reeds
 Kim Hutchcroft – saxophone
 Jerome Richardson – reeds
 Larry Williams – saxophone
 George Young – saxophone
 Frank Wess – saxophone, alto saxophone
 Frank Foster – arranger, saxophone
 John Clark – french horn
 David Duke
 Peter Gordon
 Sidney Muldrow
 Jerry Peel
 Henry Sigismonti
 Toni Price – tuba
 James (Jim)  Self – tuba
 Margaret Ross – harp
 Amy Sherman
 George Benson – guitar
 Tony Mottola – guitar
 Lee Ritenour – guitar
 Lionel Hampton – vibraphone
 Ray Brown – double bass
 Gene Cherico
 Bob Cranshaw – bass
 Major Holley – double bass, vocals on “Mack the Knife”
 Marcus Miller – bass
 Neil Stubenhaus – electric bass
 Leon "Ndugu" Chancler – drums
 Irving Cottler – drums
 Steve Gadd – drums
 John "J.R." Robinson – drums
 Ralph MacDonald – percussion
 Sy Johnson – piano, fender rhodes
 Joe Parnello 	piano, arranger, Fender rhodes
 Craig Huxley – synthesizer
 Ed Walsh
Jimmy Smith – Electric Organ
 Bob James – synthesizer, electric piano, Fender rhodes
 Hilary James – synthesizer, piano, fender rhodes
 Randy Kerber – synthesizer, piano, fender rhodes

Production personnel 
 Quincy Jones – arranger, conductor, producer
 Joseph d'Ambrosio – production coordination
 David Matthews – arranger
 Sam Nestico – arranger
 Torrie Zito – arranger
 David Smith -	engineer
 Gus Skinas – engineer, digital engineer
 Phil Ramone – engineer, mixing
 Jimmy Santis
 Stanley Wallace
 Allen Sides – engineer, assistant engineer, mixing assistant
 Steve Crimmel – engineer, associate engineer
 Mark Ettel
 Cliff Jones – engineer, associate remixing engineer
 Ollie Cotton – associate engineer
 Bradshaw Leigh – associate engineer
 Roger Nichols – digital engineer, associate engineer
 Bernie Grundman – mastering
 Lee Herschberg – digital mastering
 Don Hahn – remixing
 Elliot Scheiner – remixing, assistant engineer, mixing assistant
 Alan Berliner – photography
 Bill Ross
 Ed Thrasher
 William Warren
 Stan Cornyn – liner notes

References 

1984 albums
Frank Sinatra albums
Albums produced by Quincy Jones
Albums arranged by Quincy Jones
Qwest Records albums
Albums conducted by Quincy Jones
Albums arranged by Frank Foster (musician)
Albums arranged by David Matthews (keyboardist)
Albums arranged by Sammy Nestico